Miss Universe 1998, the 47th Miss Universe pageant, was held on May 12, 1998 at the Stan Sheriff Arena in Honolulu, Hawaii. Wendy Fitzwilliam of Trinidad and Tobago was crowned by Brook Lee of the USA at the end of the event. This marked the only second (and most recent) time that Trinidad and Tobago has won Miss Universe. 81 contestants competed in this year.

Results

Placements

Final Competition Score 

 Winner
 First Runner-up
 Second Runner-up
 Top 5 Finalist
 Top 10 Semifinalist
(#) Rank in each round of competition

Order of Announcements 

Top 10

Top 5

Top 3

Contestants

  - Emilia Guardano
  - Marcela Brane
  - Wendy Lacle
  - Renee Henderson
  - Juliette Sargent
  - Sandrine Corman
  - Elvia Vega
  - Veronica Larrieu
  - Uzmin Everts
  - Michella Marchi
  - Kaida Donovan
  - Natalia Gourkova
  - Juliana Thiessen
  - Claudia Arnello
  - Silvia Fernanda Ortiz Guerra
  - Kisha Alvarado
  - Ivana Grzetić
  - Natacha Bloem
  - Daniella Iordanova
  - Kristina Fridvalská
  - Selinés Méndez
  - Soraya Hogonaga
  - Karine Fahmy
  - María Gabriela Jovel
  - Mari Lawrens
  - Jonna Kauppila
  - Sophie Thalmann
  - Katharina Mainka
  - Francisca Awuah
  - Leilani Dowding
  - Dimitra Eginiti
  - Joylyn Munoz
  - Astrid Ramírez
  - Dania Prince
  - Virginia Yung
  - Agnes Nagy
  - Lymaraina D'Souza
  - Andrea Roche
  - Hagit Raz
  - Claudia Trieste
  - Shani McGraham
  - Nana Okumura
  - Kim Ji-yeon
  - Nina Kadis
  - Sherine Wong
  - Carol Cassar
  - Leena Ramphul
  - Katty Fuentes
  - Retha Reinders
  - Jacqueline Rotteveel
  - Rosemary Rassell
  - Claudia Alaniz
  - Chika Chikezie
  - Helene Yun Lizama
  - Stine Bergsvand
  - Tanisha Drummond
  - Luz Marina González
  - Karim Bernal
  - Jewel Lobaton
  - Sylwia Kupiec
  - Icilia Berenguel
  - Joyce Giraud
  - Juliana Elena Verdes
  - Anna Malova
  - Alice Lim
   - Vladimíra Hreňovčíková
  - Kerishnie Naicker
  - María José Besora
  - Jessica Olérs
  - Tanja Gutmann
  - Annie Tsai
  - Chalida Thaochalee
  - Wendy Fitzwilliam
  - Asuman Krause
  - Olena Spirina
  - Virginia Russo
  - Shawnae Jebbia
  - Leah Webster
  - Veruska Ramírez
  - Jelena Trninić
  - Selina Stuart

Notes

Debut

Withdrawals
  - Joanne Darrell
 
  - Harpa Lind Hardardttir 
  - Kricket Hunt

Returns
 Last competed in 1991
 
 Last competed in 1995
 
 
 
 
 Last competed in 1996

Replacements
  - Linor Abargil, Miss Israel 1998 couldn't compete due underage. Her first runner up- Hagit Raz who was Israel's Maiden of Beauty 1998 (IMB) went in her place. Later that year Abargil won Miss World 1998 crown.
  - The winner of Binibining Pilipinas Universe 1998, Tisha Silang had to resign due to her Canadian citizenship. The pageant's first runner-up - Jewel Mae Lobaton of Bacolod City, was selected as the Philippine representative in the Miss Universe 1998.

Awards
  - Miss Congeniality (Asuman Krause)
   Slovak Republic - Miss Photogenic (Vladimíra Hreňovčíková)
  - Best National Costume (Wendy Fitzwilliam)

General references

References

External links

 Miss Universe official website

1998
1998 in the United States
1998 beauty pageants
Beauty pageants in the United States
1998 in Hawaii
Events in Honolulu
May 1998 events in the United States